Melanie Sears (born 14 July 1977) is a former English elite road cyclist and former triathlete. She competed at the 2002 Commonwealth Games in Manchester.

References

1977 births
Living people
Sportspeople from Cheshire
English female cyclists
Cyclists at the 2002 Commonwealth Games
Commonwealth Games competitors for England